The Ambassador of Iran to the United Nations  is the leader of the delegation of Iran to the United Nations.  The position is more formally known as the "Permanent Representative of the Islamic Republic of Iran to the United Nations”, with the rank and status of Ambassador Extraordinary and Plenipotentiary, and Representative of Iran in the United Nations Security Council.

The currently ambassador is Saeed Iravani since July 2022.

Office-holders

The following is a chronological list of those who have held the office:

See also
 Foreign Relations of Iran
 List of permanent representatives of Iran to the United Nations Office at Geneva
 List of ambassadors of Iran to United Nations Office at Vienna

Notes

External links
 

 
Iran
United Nations